Pope Innocent XIII (r. 1721–1724) created three cardinals in two consistories:

16 June 1721
Bernardo Maria Conti, O.S.B.Cas., brother of the Pope – cardinal-priest of S. Bernardo alle Terme (received the title on 16 July 1721), † 23 April 1730

16 July 1721

Guillaume Dubois, archbishop of Cambrai – cardinal-priest without the title, † 10 August 1723
Alessandro Albani – cardinal-deacon of S. Adriano (received the title on 24 September 1724), then cardinal-deacon of S. Maria in Cosmedin (23 September 1722), cardinal-deacon of S. Agata in Suburra (7 August 1741), cardinal-deacon of S. Maria ad martyres (11 March 1743), cardinal-deacon of S. Maria in Via Lata (10 April 1747), † 11 December 1779

External links

Innocent XIII
College of Cardinals
18th-century Catholicism